Keir David Peters Gilchrist (born 28 September 1992) is a Canadian actor and musician. On television, he portrayed Marshall Gregson on the Showtime comedy-drama United States of Tara (2009–2011) and headlined the Netflix comedy-drama Atypical (2017–2021).  His film roles include the comedy-drama It's Kind of a Funny Story (2010) and the supernatural horror It Follows (2014). Outside of his acting career, Gilchrist is the vocalist of grindcore band Whelm and death metal band Phalanx.

Early life
Gilchrist was born in Camden Town, London, to Canadian parents Catherine (née Peters) and Ian Gilchrist. His maternal grandfather was banker, economist, and politician Douglas Peters, and his uncle is economist David Wilfrid Peters. Gilchrist spent his early years in London, before relocating to Boston, Massachusetts, during his childhood, then to New York City, before finally settling in Toronto, Ontario.

Career
Gilchrist attended the Annex Children's Theatre. Gilchrist's first significant television role was that of Josh McKellar on Fox's short-lived television sitcom The Winner, which aired in 2007. From 2009 until its ending in 2011, Gilchrist co-starred as Marshall Gregson, the son of the lead character, on the Showtime comedy-drama series United States of Tara.

In 2009, Gilchrist won the lead role of Craig Gilner in the film It's Kind of a Funny Story, which premiered at the Sundance Film Festival in January 2010.

In 2014, Gilchrist co-starred in the film It Follows.

In 2015, he played the lead role of Daniel Austin in the film Dark Summer, starred as John Lovett in The Stanford Prison Experiment and William in Len and Company, and had a role in the short drama film Share.

In 2016, he co-starred in the film The Good Neighbor.

In 2017, he starred in the film Heartthrob as Henry, directed by Chris Sivertson.

In August 2017, he began starring as Sam Gardner, a teen on the autism spectrum, in the Netflix comedy-drama Atypical. The fourth and final season of Atypical was released on 9 July 2021.

Filmography

Film

Television

Music videos

References

External links

 
 
 The United States of Keir Gilchrist

1992 births
21st-century Canadian male actors
Canadian male child actors
Canadian male film actors
Canadian male television actors
Canadian male voice actors
English people of Canadian descent
English emigrants to Canada
Living people
Male actors from London
People from Camden Town